Rubus glaucus, commonly known as  or Andean raspberry, is a species of blackberry found in Latin America from Mexico to Bolivia, including the northern and central Andes. It is similar to a loganberry in terms of taste and utility.

Rubus glaucus is a perennial semi-erect climbing shrub, belonging to the rose family. It consists of several round and spiny stems that form the corona of the plant, 1 to 2 cm in diameter, and can grow up to 3 m. The leaves are trifoliate with serrated edges, dark green and white beam beneath. Both stems and leaves are covered by a white powder.

The fruit is an ellipsoid compound drupe of 15 to 25 mm at its widest diameter, weighing 3-5 grams, green when formed, becoming red when ripe and then dark and bright purple. It consists of small drupes attached to the receptacle when ripe and fleshy whitish rich in vitamin C, calcium and phosphorus, bittersweet, and suitable for juices, nectars, jams, jellies, ice cream, pastries and confectionery. Fruit production is continuous with two annual peaks. Plants reach maturity and produce fruit after the first year extending through the rest of the plant's life which can be 12 to 20 years.

The plant grows best at temperatures between 12 and 19 °C, with relative humidity of 80 to 90%, high sunshine and well distributed rainfall between 800 and 2,500 mm a year.
It is native to tropical highlands of northwestern South America and Central America and prefers elevations between 1,500 m and 3,100 m. In countries such as Costa Rica it is found in the upper part of the Cordillera de Talamanca and the Central Volcanic Cordillera.

Similar species
Rubus adenotrichos (Schltdl. 1839) wild blackberry
Rubus bogotensis (Kunth, 1824) Black mulberry
Rubus giganteus (Benth. 1846) Cat blackberry or Moor blackberry 
Rubus megalococcus (Focke, 1874) Small mora
Rubus nubigenus (Kunth, 1824) Large mora

References

External links
 

glaucus
Flora of South America
Flora of Mexico
Flora of Central America
Plants described in 1845
Berries